Kamil Sabali (born 23 April 1970) is a Lebanese judoka. He competed in the men's half-lightweight event at the 1988 Summer Olympics.

References

1970 births
Living people
Lebanese male judoka
Olympic judoka of Lebanon
Judoka at the 1988 Summer Olympics
Place of birth missing (living people)
20th-century Lebanese people